Aleksa Zarić (born March 28, 1998) is a Serbian professional basketball player for Hercegovac of the Second League of Serbia.

Professional career 
Zarić started professional basketball career in his hometown team Vojvodina. In April 2019, Zarić was loaned out to Mega Bemax for the rest of the 2018–19 Serbian League season.

References

External links 
 Profile at realgm.com
 Profile at eurobasket.com
 Statistics at sportando.basketball

1998 births
Living people
Basketball League of Serbia players
KK Mega Basket players
KK Vojvodina players
Serbian men's basketball players
Shooting guards
Basketball players from Novi Sad